Franyely Sarahí Rodríguez Itanare (born 21 September 1997) is a Venezuelan footballer who plays as a goalkeeper for Spanish club CD Castellón. She has been a member of the Venezuela women's national team.

International career
Rodríguez represented Venezuela at the 2014 FIFA U-17 Women's World Cup and the 2016 FIFA U-20 Women's World Cup. At senior level, she was part of the squad for the 2014 Copa América Femenina, but did not play. She played two matches in 2014 Central American and Caribbean Games.

References

External links

1997 births
Living people
Women's association football goalkeepers
Venezuelan women's footballers
People from Carabobo
Venezuela women's international footballers
Competitors at the 2014 Central American and Caribbean Games
Carabobo F.C. players
Atlético Bucaramanga footballers
Venezuelan expatriate women's footballers
Venezuelan expatriate sportspeople in Colombia
Expatriate women's footballers in Colombia